Timothy, Timmy, or Tim Brown may refer to:

Music
 Timothy Brown (bassist) (born 1969), bassist for the band The Boo Radleys
 Timothy Brown (conductor) (born 1946), English choral conductor
 Timothy Brown (hornist), English hornist

Sports

Gridiron football
 Tim Brown (American football) (born 1966), American wide receiver and 1987 Heisman Trophy winner
 Tim Brown (Canadian football) (born 1984), American football running back and kick returner in the Canadian Football League
 Timmy Brown or Timothy Brown (actor) (1937–2020), American football running back in the NFL and actor

Other sports
 Tim Brown (darts player) (born 1944), retired Australian darts player
 Tim Brown (figure skater) (1938–1989), American former figure skater
 Tim Brown (footballer) (born 1981), association football player from New Zealand

Others
 Timothy Brown (actor) (1937–2020), American singer and former actor and NFL football player
 Timothy Brown (game designer), American role-playing game designer
 Timothy Brown (judge) (1889–1977), American jurist
 Timothy Brown (radical) (1743/4–1820), English banker, merchant and radical
 Timothy Ray Brown (1966–2020), also known as the Berlin Patient, American considered to be the first person cured of HIV
 Timothy Yeats Brown (1789–1858), banker and British consul to Genoa
 Tim Brown (Indiana politician) (born 1956), American politician
 Tim Brown (Ohio politician) (born 1962), American politician

See also
 Spirit House (Georgetown, New York), also known as Timothy Brown House or Brown's Hall